David Coe may refer to:

David Allan Coe (born 1939), American outlaw country music singer
David Coe (businessman) (1950s–2013), Australian businessman